Andreas de Silva (fl. 1520) was a composer, probably of Portuguese origin, who is known mainly from inclusion of five motets in the Medici Codex. 
Now attributed to de Silva is a madrigal Che sentisti Madonna, misattributed to Verdelot in 1537.

Recordings
5 motets on Le Divin Arcadelt: Candlemas in Renaissance Rome Arcadelt: Missa ‘Ave Regina caelorum’. Hodie beata virgo Maria. Pater noster. Palestrina:  Senex Puerum Portabat. Diffusa est gratia. Silva, A: Ave Regina caelorum. Inviolata, integra et casta es Maria. Chant: Suscepimus, Deus (Introit). Suscepimus, Deus (Gradual). Nunc dimittis (Tract). Responsum accepit Simeon (Communio). Musica Contexta with The English Cornett and Sackbut Ensemble Chandos Classics 2011
Motet: "Nigra Sum" on "Palestrina Masses" by The Tallis Scholars Gimell CDGIM 003 1996

References

16th-century classical composers